Maxwell Arthur Burr,  (born 9 January 1939) is an Australian retired politician. Born in Launceston, Tasmania, he was educated at Launceston Business College before becoming an accountant and Secretary of the Tasmanian Farmers' Federation. In 1975, he was elected to the Australian House of Representatives as the Liberal member for Wilmot, defeating long-serving Labor member Gil Duthie. When Wilmot was abolished in 1984, Burr successfully contested its successor, Lyons. He held the seat until his retirement in 1993.

After retirement, Burr was diagnosed with Parkinson's disease in 2012. In 2019, news coverage documented his use of experimental infrared light therapy as a treatment for his condition, which he believed had significantly alleviated a large number of his symptoms and which had encouraged a number of other people to do likewise. A clinical trial of the system was announced in early 2019.

Burr was awarded a Medal of the Order of Australia (OAM) in the 2021 Australia Day Honours for "service to the Parliament of Australia, and to the community of Tasmania."

References

|-

Liberal Party of Australia members of the Parliament of Australia
Members of the Australian House of Representatives for Wilmot
Members of the Australian House of Representatives for Lyons
Members of the Australian House of Representatives
1939 births
Living people
Politicians from Launceston, Tasmania
20th-century Australian politicians
Recipients of the Medal of the Order of Australia